Rio do Fogo is a municipality in the state of Rio Grande do Norte in the Northeast region of Brazil. The municipality is named after a river which means the "River of Fire".

Another river is Rio Guaxinim (Tupi originated name) located nearby and a beach called Pititinga. Along the coast is a wind farm that energy to parts of the state.

Rio do Fogo is connected with the BR-101, the longest highway in Brazil.

See also 
 List of municipalities in Rio Grande do Norte

References

External links

Municipalities in Rio Grande do Norte
Populated coastal places in Rio Grande do Norte